Ivan Golub (born January 10, 1989) is a Ukrainian professional boxer. As an amateur he competed with the team of Ukraine alongside Oleksandr Usyk, Vasyl Lomachenko, and Oleksandr Gvozdyk.

He currently fights in the Welterweight Division, ranks as the 24th-best Welterweight in the world, and is the #1 ranked Ukrainian in the Welterweight division by BoxRec. Golub has many impressive wins against stars like Eric Walker and Lanardo Tyner.

Golub has been nicknamed “The Volk,” as the Russian translation translates into Wolf. Golub has a knockout-win ratio of 76%, and 24% of his wins have come by decision.

Amateur career

As an amateur, Golub had many outstanding results. He had a record of 270-32 before he transitioned into his professional career. He was a five-time Ukrainian National Champion in his amateur career. 

Golub has competed in significant amateur events, including the Junior World Championships in 2006 and the World Championships in 2009. In these two events, Golub successfully secured the bronze medal in both events. 

In 2012, Golub fought in the World Series of Boxing tournament. This league was organized by the AIBA. He competed in the middleweight division, winning all five bouts.

Professional career

Early career

Golub made his professional debut in mid-2014, at the age of 25. He signed a promotional deal with DiBella Entertainment which is run by Lou DiBella, fighting out of Brooklyn. Golub made his debut fighting in the Middleweight division. 

On June 27th, 2014, Golub successfully defeated opponent Javon Wright in his first pro bout via unanimous decision. Almost four months later, Golub won his second bout via a first-round knockout against American fighter Kirk Huff. Finally, in late 2014, Golub had two more fights, winning both via knockout defeating Tyson Harrison and Josh Williams.

Golub vs. Clark

On 30 June 2017, he faced Jamontay Clark at Huntington Center, Toledo. Clark came out victorious by unanimous decision  in their bout, with two judges scoring the bout 75-77, 75-77, and the third judge scoring it 73-79, all in favor of Clark. 

This bout was on the main card of the Robert Easter Jr. vs. Denis Shafikov event. Two questionable decisions on this card included Denis Shafikov and Golub. 

The bout between Golub and Clark was set for eight rounds, with each round being 3 minutes. Both fighters before the bout had undefeated records, with Golub coming in at 13-0-0 and Clark at 11-0-0.

Golub vs Conwell
He was scheduled to fight Charles Conwell on April 8, 2021 in a ten-round main event fight. Conwell had to withdraw from the fight reportedly from a hand injury.

Golub vs Walker
On 3 August 2021, Golub fought against Eric Walker for the IBF-USBA Welterweight Title at the Hulu Theater, New York. Despite the slow start in the first two rounds, the southpaw from Ukraine dominated the rest of the fight knocking down Walker twice in the fight in rounds five and nine. Golub won the fight by unanimous decision, extending his win streak to seven in a row. The three judges scored the bout 96-92, 97-91, and 98-90, all in favor of Golub. As a result, Golub claimed the vacant IBF-USBA Welterweight Title, improving his ranking in the IBF to #7 worldwide.

Golub vs Tucker
On 13 October 2022, Golub made his return to the boxing ring after 14 months of inactivity against Wesely Tucker. The fight was scheduled to be a 10-round Welterweight Contest, which was a Co-feature to Heather Hardy vs Calista Silgado. The fight took place at Sony Hall, New York organized by a new promotional company listed as Boxing Insider. Despite having a slow start, Golub had an impressive third and fourth round, causing Tucker's corner to stop the fight. Golub landed many tactical combinations that Tucker could not handle. As a result, Golub improved his record to 21 wins and 1 loss.

Professional boxing record

References

Living people
1989 births
Ukrainian male boxers
Sportspeople from Donetsk
Welterweight boxers
Southpaw boxers